Metz–Nancy–Lorraine Airport or Aéroport de Metz–Nancy–Lorraine  is an airport serving the Lorraine région of France. It is located in Goin, 16.5 km southeast of Metz, (both communes of the Moselle département) and north of Nancy (a commune of Meurthe-et-Moselle). It opened to the public on October 28, 1991 and replaced Nancy–Essey and Metz–Frescaty airports.

Infrastructure

The airport is open 24/7. The runway was lengthened to 3050 m and refurbished in mid-2006 to be able to handle all types of large aircraft. The terminal building is about 7500 square metres and could accommodate up to 500,000 passengers per year with 14 check-in desks, 2 gates and 2 luggage claim belts. The cargo terminal is 3,600 square metres and could handle up to 60,000 tonnes of freight per year. The airport was a regional hub for DHL from 2000 to 2006, with flights to Toulouse, Nice, Marseilles, Cologne, Brussels, Paris, Vitoria and East-Midlands.

Airlines and destinations
The following airlines operate regular scheduled and charter flights at Metz–Nancy–Lorraine Airport:

Statistics

Ground transportation
A shuttle bus to Nancy and Metz meets every departing and arriving flight. The journey takes about 30 minutes and costs 8 euros.

References

External links 

Aéroport Metz Nancy Lorraine (official site) 
Aéroport de Metz–Nancy–Lorraine at Union des Aéroports Français 

Airports in Grand Est
Transport in Nancy, France
Transport in Metz
Buildings and structures in Moselle (department)
Transport in Grand Est
Airports established in 1991
1991 establishments in France